The Flag Officer, Ground Training  was a senior Royal Navy appointment responsible for all naval aviation ground training from 1949 to 1957.

History
The post was established in January 1949 following the abolition of the office of Flag Officer, Carrier Training in 1945 that commands responsibilities were divided to creating subordinate commands each concentrating specific areas of responsibility. The post was abolished in 1957. The office holder reported to Flag Officer, Air (Home).

Responsibilities
Included:
Administration of six Naval Air Stations at: 
 RNAS Lee-on-Solent (HMS Daedalus)
 RNAS Arbroath – (HMS Condor)
 RNAS Bramcote – (HMS Gamecock)
 RNAS Gosport – (HMS Siskin)
 RNAS Worthy Down – (Kestral -HMS Ariel)
 RNAS St Merryn (HMS Vulture).

Administration of
 Royal Naval Barracks at Lee-on-the-Solent.

Flag Officers, Ground Training
Post holders included:

 Rear-Admiral Douglas H. Everett: January 1949 – May 1951 
 Rear-Admiral Cecil R.L. Parry: May 1951 – May 1953 
 Rear-Admiral Arthur D. Torlesse: May 1953 – November 1954 
 Rear-Admiral Ralph L. Fisher: November 1954 – 1957

References

G
Naval aviation units and formations of the United Kingdom